Persiaran Kewajipan is a major road in Subang Jaya, Selangor, Malaysia. The road connects from central Subang Jaya through USJ to Putra Heights near the city's south interchange at Damansara–Puchong Expressway E11 (LDP). It is the busiest road in Subang Jaya during rush hour from/to Kuala Lumpur. This driveway is maintained by the Subang Jaya City Council or Majlis Bandaraya Subang Jaya (MBSJ).

There is an elevated Kelana Jaya line running through Persiaran Kewajipan which are USJ 7, Taipan, Wawasan and USJ 21.

List of interchanges

See also
Persiaran Surian, similar road located in Kota Damansara, Petaling Jaya that has an evaluated Sungai Buloh–Kajang MRT line.

Highways in Malaysia